Georgi Purvanov Damyanov (23 September 1892 – 27 November 1958) was a Bulgarian communist politician.

Damyanov was born in Lopushna, near Ferdinand (today Montana), Bulgaria and joined the Bulgarian Social Democratic Workers' Party (Narrow Socialists) in 1912, which later became the Bulgarian Communist Party. He served as Defence Minister during the first stage of Bulgaria's communist regime, from 1946 to 1950. On 27 May 1950 he was elected as the Chairman of the Presidium of the National Assembly (nominal head of state of Bulgaria). He served in that position for 8 years, until his death. He died in Sofia, Bulgaria. During his time in office much of the power was held by the first secretaries of the party, first Vulko Chervenkov and then by Todor Zhivkov.

External links
Rulers.org

1892 births
1958 deaths
People from Montana Province
Bulgarian Communist Party politicians
Heads of state of Bulgaria
Frunze Military Academy alumni
Defence ministers of Bulgaria